Ali Arshad Mir (January 1, 1951 – October 16, 2008) was an epic Punjabi poet and writer, sometimes described as the "Homer of Punjab". His works have been translated into languages such as Urdu and English. In the 1970s, his International Anthem brought him recognition. His lines, girti hui dewaroo koo aik dhaka aur do are a popular slogan in the Punjab and around the world. His work includes dozens of poems that depict the socio-economic condition of society's oppressed people. They also highlight the sacrifices of the subcontinent's resistance movements.

Personal life 
Ali Arshad was born in a Muslim family in a Chishtian district, 250 km away from Lahore, Punjab, Pakistan. He completed his M.A. in Punjabi language, and was appointed as an Associate Professor in Government M.A.O College Lahore. Later, he joined Government Degree College Depalpur, Okara as its Principal. He also worked with Mazdoor Kissan Party. He was a dervish, down to earth and straightforward man who would never go for flattery for any favours or for compromises. That’s why he was transferred 26 times during his educational career as an educationist.  He was also a great activist who always raised a voice for rights of workers and those pushed to the margins of society

Major works 
Mir Sahab wrote his first work of poetry at the age of 16 and was considered an "Inqilabi", or profound poet, from a very early age. He dedicated his life to the depiction of the suffering of the underprivileged. His poems are considered a source of inspiration for oppressed people. In the 1970s, he wrote the revolutionary international anthem, "Girti hui deewaro ko aik dhaka aur do", which remains a popular slogan used in rebellions. In the same era, he wrote a Pakistani shadow play, Ravi Sy Bias Tak. He  compiled the posthumous work of Ustad Daman and named it Daman Daye Moti.

Kaifi Azmi translated Mir's poems to Urdu. Waheed Ahmed's poem "khana badosh", considered a major Urdu work, was derived from Mir Sahab's epic poem "Gawathi Katha di War".

Legacy 
Mir Sahab died in October 2008. His last words were "nazam kuj chair baad samny ay gee" and he rests in Bahawalnagar Punjab, Pakistan.

His literary work was published posthumously. His book Ik Katha De War consists of autobiographical notes about his life, beliefs and teachings. The play Ravi Sy Bias Tak is included in the syllabus of National College of Arts.

Every year, the Mir Foundation organizes Punjabi Mela, an event that consists of poets and people associated with Punjabi literature paying Mir tribute by organizing his works. In 2018, First Dalit Mela was organized by Mir foundation and MNS University of Agriculture which depicted hardship, life and culture of lower caste Hindus residing in Pakistan, it had several events and dramatized plays based on works of prominent writers like Munshi Premchand. The festival has a lot to offer including literary sessions, performances, stalls and last but not the least food-for-thought conversations by various speakers. The festival also has several books and handicrafts stalls promoting cultural diversity and education.

References

External links 
 Zee news November 22, 2008
Ali Arshad Mir

Pakistani dramatists and playwrights
Poets from Punjab, Pakistan
Poets from Lahore
People from Bahawalnagar District
1951 births
2008 deaths